Rosnay is a commune in the Vendée department in the Pays de la Loire region in western France.

Geography
The river Yon forms all of the commune's south-western border, then flows into the Lay, which forms part of its southern border.

See also
Communes of the Vendée department

References

Communes of Vendée